The Wenatchee Mountains are a range of mountains in central Washington State, United States of America. A major subrange of the Cascade Range, extending east  from the Cascade crest, the Wenatchee Mountains separate the drainage basins of the Yakima River from the Wenatchee River. The crest of the range forms part of the boundary between Chelan and Kittitas Counties.

Extent
Fred Beckey describes the Wenatchee Mountains as the area between the Wenatchee and Yakima rivers and Stevens Pass.

According to Peakbagger.com the Wenatchee Mountains are defined as bounded by U.S. Route 2 from Stevens Pass to Wenatchee on the Columbia River, then down the Columbia River to Interstate 90, then west along the highway to the vicinity of Cle Elum and Roslyn, then north along Cle Elum Lake and the Cle Elum River and north to Stevens Pass. Subranges of the Wenatchee Mountains and their highest peaks as defined by Peakbagger.com are the Chiwaukum Mountains (Big Chiwaukum Mountain), North Wenatchee Mountains (Cashmere Mountain), Stuart Range (Mount Stuart), the Teanaway Area (Ingalls Peak), and the Mission-Naneum Ridges (Mission Peak). Peakbagger.com also defines and names the mountain regions bordering the Wenatchee Mountains. These are the Alpine Lakes Area to the west, South Cascade Crest to the south, Glacier Peak-North Stevens Pass area to the northwest, and the Entiat Mountains to the northeast.

The USGS GNIS defines the range with a simple list seven points in a line, running from approximately Paddy-Go-Easy Pass and Granite Mountain to approximately Blewett Pass and Naneum Creek.

Major Peaks

Partial list of peaks:

 Mount Stuart -  - 
 Dragontail Peak -  - 
 Colchuck Peak -  - 
 Cannon Mountain -  - 
 Sherpa Peak -  - 
 Enchantment Peak -  - 
 Witches Tower -  - 
 Cashmere Mountain	-  - 
 Argonaut Peak -  - 
 Little Annapurna -  - 
 McClellan Peak -  - 
 Eightmile Mountain -  - 
 The Cradle -  - 
 Hawkins Mountain -  - 
 Granite Mountain -  - 
 Earl Peak -  - 
 Mac Peak -  - 
 Three Brothers -  - 
 Thunder Mountain Lakes Peak - 
 Trico Mountain -  - 
 Thunder Mountain -  - 
 Slippery Slab Tower -  -

Natural history

The Wenatchee Mountains are in the rain shadow of the main Cascade Range and hence are drier and have fewer trees. This comparative lack of trees offers good wildflower displays and wide views. Serpentine soils are found within the Wenatchee Mountains, modifying the plant communities in those areas.

The Wenatchee Mountains are home to a number of rare, endemic, or disjunct plant species, including Androsace nivalis var. dentata, Claytonia megarhiza var. nivalis, Delphinium viridescens, Lewisiopsis tweedyi, Trifolium thompsonii, and Valeriana columbiana.  The Wenatchee Mountains checkermallow (Sidalcea oregano var. calva) occurs only along Peshastin Creek, south of Leavenworth, Washington.  It is the rarest plant in Washington, and is now on the endangered species list.

See also
Albert Hale Sylvester
 List of mountain ranges in Washington

References

External links

Mountain ranges of Washington (state)
Cascade Range
Landforms of Chelan County, Washington
Landforms of Kittitas County, Washington